The Net River is a  tributary of the South Fork Nemadji River in Pine and Carlton counties, Minnesota, United States.  Via the Nemadji River, it flows to Lake Superior at Superior, Wisconsin.

"Net River" is probably an English translation of the Ojibwe-language name.

See also
List of rivers of Minnesota

References

Minnesota Watersheds
USGS Hydrologic Unit Map - State of Minnesota (1974)

Rivers of Minnesota
Tributaries of Lake Superior
Rivers of Pine County, Minnesota
Rivers of Carlton County, Minnesota